Sathyasiva is an Indian film director who has worked on Tamil films. After making his debut with Kazhugu (2012), he has gone on to make Sivappu (2015) and Savaale Samaali (2015). Kazhugu 2 (2018 film) (2018)

Career
Sathaysiva made his directorial debut with Kazhugu (2012), a tale people who recover bodies of suicide victims who jump off cliffs, with Kreshna and Bindu Madhavi forming the lead cast. The film, upon release, fetched mixed reviews. A reviewer from Sify.com said Kazhugu was a "realistic romantic thriller that seldom loses its grip on your attention. Credible performances from its leads, a nail-biting screenplay along with a fresh milieu makes it an engaging film". The Times of India gave it 3.5 out of 5, claiming that it was "gripping from start to finish". Likewise, Malathi Rangarajam from The Hindu wrote: "It's heartening to see young filmmakers daring to steer clear of stereotypes. S. Sathyasiva who makes his bow with Kazhugu is the latest in this category". The critic further cited that director Sathyasiva was "a director to watch out for".

Following the release of Kazhugu, Sathyasiva immediately began work on his next venture in April 2012 starting Andhi Mazhai Megam, a story revolving around the lives of Sri Lankan refugees who work as construction workers in Tamil Nadu. The director then chose to rename the film as Sivappu (2015), revealing that the title also denotes themes of love, anger, poverty, violence and communism. Production began in August 2012, with Telugu actor Naveen Chandra and Rupa Manjari picked to play the lead pair, but delays meant that the film only had a theatrical release in October 2015, becoming his third film. The film opened to average reviews, with critics lauding the actors' performances along with Madhu Ambat's cinematography while complaining about the unconvincing blend of romance, comedy and drama.

During the period when Sivappu was stuck, Sathyasiva began pre-production work on  Thalapakatti with Vikram Prabhu, Nazriya Nazim and Rajkiran in the lead roles. A remake of the Malayalam film Ustad Hotel, the film developed throughout late 2013, before being dropped. Sathyasiva then made a comedy film titled Savaale Samaali (2015) featuring Ashok Selvan and Bindu Madhavi. The film opened to mixed reviews, but performed poorly at the box office. Sathyasiva is currently working on an untitled war film with Jiiva in the lead role, set in the backdrop of 1942.

Filmography

References

21st-century Indian film directors
Tamil-language film directors
Living people
Year of birth missing (living people)